Shir-e Mard (also Romanized as Shīr-e Mard and Shīr Mard; also known as Āqā Shīr Mard) is a village in Ahram Rural District, in the Central District of Tangestan County, Bushehr Province, Iran. At the 2006 census, its population was 37, in 12 families.

References 

Populated places in Tangestan County